Ruyi Bridge is a footbridge in Taizhou, Zhejiang China, made up of three bridges. It is a pedestrian bridge which was built to cross the Shenxianju Valley and it features a glass-bottomed walkway. The unusual curved walkways are designed to look like a Chinese ruyi.

The bridge gained notoriety in the West when Canadian astronaut Chris Hadfield uploaded a video to Twitter.

Background 

Planning for the bridge began in 2017. The bridge was opened in September 2020 and was visited by 200,000 people by November 2020. Ruyi Bridge was designed by structural steel expert, He Yunchang and made to resemble jade ruyi, which is a Chinese symbol for good fortune. The bridge was built to be a tourist attraction, spanning the Shenxianju Valley, and is one of China's 2000 glass bottom bridges. It is the major attraction spanning the west canyons of Shenxianju, in the Shenxianju Scenic Area.

The bridge was introduced to the Western Internet when Canadian astronaut Chris Hadfield uploaded a drone video of the bridge to Twitter which went viral. The video carried the caption: "I'd want better handrails". Many viewers doubted that the bridge was real, and eventually Snopes opened an investigation and determined that the bridge is real and not a deepfake.

Design 
The bridge is wavy and has three separate foot paths, portions of which have a glass bottom. The design has been described as three undulating bridges which are meant to blend in with the natural scenery. Madeleine Grey of The Sydney Morning Herald described the bridge's appearance as a "mix between DNA strand and a futuristic Eye of Sauron."

The bridge designer He Yunchang is the same structural engineer who was involved in the design of the "Bird's Nest," a stadium used for the 2008 Olympic Games in Beijing.

References

External links 
The Engineering of The Ruyi Bridge
Ruyi Bridge video
Snopes, Is the Ruyi Bridge in China Real?

Bridges in China
Tourist attractions in Zhejiang
Bridges completed in 2020
Glass-bottomed bridges